Luiz Henrique Cocuzzi (born 2 August 1993) is a Brazilian cross-country mountain biker, who currently rides for UCI Continental team . He competed at the 2020 Summer Olympics.

References

External links

Living people
1993 births
Brazilian male cyclists
Brazilian mountain bikers
Cross-country mountain bikers
Olympic cyclists of Brazil
Cyclists at the 2020 Summer Olympics
Sportspeople from São Paulo
21st-century Brazilian people